The League of Legends Master Series (LMS) was a professional League of Legends league with teams from Taiwan, Hong Kong, and Macau from 2015 to 2019. Eight teams competed over two seasons to qualify for the League of Legends World Championship. In September 2019, Riot announced that the LMS would merge with the League of Legends SEA Tour (LST) to create a new professional league for all Garena-affiliated regions except Vietnam, the Pacific Championship Series (PCS).

History 
An announcement was made by Garena in October 2014 about plans of creating a new league to separate Taiwan, Hong Kong, and Macau from the rest of the Garena Premier League (GPL) of Southeast Asia. The league would have two seasons per year, spring and summer. The regional quota of two slots in the GPL and a single seed in the World Championship every year temporarily offset the dominance of the Taiwanese teams, but these conditions were not enough as the slots of the Southeast Asia in the World Championship 2014 were both filled by Taiwanese teams. As part of the changes to the 2015 GPL, the region consisting of Taiwan, Hong Kong, and Macau left the GPL and began to compete instead in the League of LMS, which replaced the Nova League in Taiwan. This action was done to allow Southeast Asian teams a better chance at winning the GPL, as Taiwanese teams had won every GPL season.

In September 2019, it was announced that the LMS would be merged with the League of Legends SEA Tour (LST) to create a new professional league for all Garena-affiliated regions (excluded Vietnam), the Pacific Championship Series (PCS).

Logistics 
Each LMS team was supported by Garena with NT$200,000, which did not include prize money. Teams from Hong Kong and Macau were provided with flights and accommodations, and received an additional NT$60,000. The beginning of the LMS coincided with the construction of the Garena e-Sports Stadium, located on the first floor of an office building in Neihu, Taipei.

Format

Group stage 
 Offline tournament
 Double round robin, matches are best-of-three
 Top four teams receives a spot in playoffs
 Bottom team will play in the promotion tournament for a spot in the next season

Playoffs 
 Offline tournament
 Single elimination tournament, seeding is based on regular season ranks
 All matches are best-of-five
 Total prize pool is NT$5,800,000 (≈$182,740 USD)

Past seasons

References 

2014 establishments in Taiwan
League of Legends competitions
Sports leagues in Asia